Michael Slackman is an American journalist for The New York Times. He is the paper's International Editor.

Life
Michael Slackman is of Jewish descent and graduated from the Northeastern University School of Journalism.

He was the Cairo Bureau Chief, for the Los Angeles Times, and the Moscow Bureau Chief for Newsday.

He was The New York Times Berlin bureau chief from June 2009 to June 2010 and the Cairo bureau chief from 2002 to 2009.

He won a 1997 National Award for Education Reporting.
Newsday won the 1997 Pulitzer Prize for Spot News Reporting, for its coverage of TWA Flight 800, and Slackman was part of the team.

References

External links

Charlierose.com
"Michael Slackman", Sean Leviashvili's blog, May 25, 2009

Living people
The New York Times masthead editors
Northeastern University alumni
Pulitzer Prize for Breaking News Reporting winners
Year of birth missing (living people)
Place of birth missing (living people)